Jigsaw John is an American crime drama television series that aired on NBC from February 2 until June 14, 1976, based on the career of real-life Los Angeles Police Department (LAPD) robbery-homicide Detective "Jigsaw John" St. John.  It was preceded, during the previous television season, by the TV movie They Only Come Out at Night.

Premise
John St. John is an LAPD detective who solves murder cases.

Cast
Jack Warden as "Jigsaw" John St. John
Alan Feinstein as Sam Donner
Pippa Scott as Maggie Hearn

Episodes

References

External links
IMDb
TV.com
TV Guide

1976 American television series debuts
1976 American television series endings
1970s American crime drama television series
English-language television shows
NBC original programming
Television series by MGM Television
Television shows set in Los Angeles